Chauncey D. Howell, Jr. (July 15, 1935 – September 20, 2021) was an American newscaster, radio journalist, and print journalist; he was a five-time Emmy Award recipient. Howell was born in Easton, Pennsylvania, and attended Amherst College as a Classics major.

After a career at Women's Wear Daily, he worked in New York for WABC-TV and WNBC. Chauncey Howell subsequently worked for News 12 Long Island. His print journalism has appeared in The New York Times, Playboy, Cosmopolitan, Esquire, and McCall's.

Howell was a descendant of Edward Howell (1584-1655), a founder of Southampton, New York.
 
Howell died on September 20, 2021, in his native Easton, Pennsylvania, aged  86.

References 
Easton native awarded two Emmys in 1989
Local broadcaster Chauncey Howell called up by WABC Radio in 1990

External links 
 

1935 births
2021 deaths
Journalists from Pennsylvania
20th-century American journalists
American male journalists
American fashion journalists
Emmy Award winners
20th-century American male writers
American people of English descent
People from Easton, Pennsylvania
Journalists from New York City